The 2005 Buffalo Bulls football team represented the University at Buffalo in the 2005 NCAA Division I-A football season. The Bulls offense scored 110 points while the defense allowed 327 points. Buffalo also didn't score a touchdown until a Week 4 game against Western Michigan, where they lost 31-21.

Schedule

References

Buffalo
Buffalo Bulls football seasons
Buffalo Bulls football